CKM is a men's magazine, (shortened to English Cool Kind of Men, Polish Czasopismo każdego mężczyzny, Hungarian Céltudatos Kalandvágyó [Férfiak] Magazinja and Serbian Cice, Kola, Medvedi). The Polish title literally means  Every Men's Magazine, but read as an abbreviation (correct spelling: ckm, in lower case) it also means ciężki karabin maszynowy ("heavy machine gun").

History and profile
CKM was established by Marquard Media in 1998. It is a family of cultural semi-erotic monthly magazines for men, focused mainly on entertainment and factography. It encompassed editions in Poland and Hungary. The latter was launched in 1998. Both Polish and Hungarian editions were part of the Marquard Media. There is also a CKM - Serbian edition launched in September 2003.

Piotr Gontowski is the editor-in-chief of the Polish edition.

The written tone is outspoken, provocative, at the same time finding humour and dealing with the most serious issues. The magazine also covers articles on lifestyle topics.

International editions
(starting at the accompanying date, or during the accompanying date range)
 Polish (1998-2019), original edition
 Hungarian (1998-2013)
 Serbian (2003-2014)

References

External links
Polish edition (pl)
Hungarian edition (hu)
Serbian edition (sr)

1998 establishments in Poland
Entertainment magazines
Satirical magazines published in Europe
Lifestyle magazines
Magazines established in 1998
Monthly magazines published in Poland
Magazines published in Poland
Polish-language magazines
Pornographic men's magazines